Steel Curtain may refer to:

 Operation Steel Curtain, a military operation executed by coalition forces in 2005
 Steel Curtain, the 1970s Pittsburgh Steelers defensive line
 Steel Curtain (roller coaster), a steel roller coaster at Kennywood in West Mifflin, Pennsylvania

See also
 Iron Curtain